Sir Nicholas Bacon (c. 1622–1687) was a Tory M.P. for Ipswich, between 16 March 1685 and his death in 1687. He served with Sir John Barker.

He was the son of Nicholas Bacon of Shrubland Hall, Suffolk,  and his wife Martha Bingham. His father was educated at Emmanuel College, Cambridge before being admitted to Gray's Inn.

References

Sources

English MPs 1685–1687
People of the English Civil War
1622 births
1687 deaths
Members of the Parliament of England (pre-1707) for Ipswich
Alumni of Emmanuel College, Cambridge
Members of Gray's Inn